The rivière des Hamel (in English: Hamel River) is a tributary of the west bank of Bras Saint-Victor which flows into the Chaudière River; the latter flows northward to empty on the south shore of the St. Lawrence River. It flows in the municipalities of Saint-Évariste-de-Forsyth, Adstock (Sainte-Method-de-Frontenac sector) and Saint-Éphrem-de-Beauce, in the administrative region of Chaudière-Appalaches, in Quebec, in Canada.

Geography 

The main neighboring watersheds of the Hamel river are:
 north side: Prévost-Gilbert River, Noire River;
 east side: Bras Saint-Victor, Fabrique stream, Pozer River, Chaudière River;
 south side: Bras Saint-Victor, Bernard stream, Vaseux stream;
 west side: Tardif-Bizier stream, Fortin-Dupuis River, Muskrat river, Petite rivière Muskrat.

From its source, the Hamel river flows over  divided into the following segments:
  northeasterly, up to the limit between Saint-Évariste-de-Forsyth and Adstock ("Sainte-Méthode-de-Frontenac" sector);
  north-east, up to the tenth rang road;
  northeasterly, up to the limit of Saint-Éphrem-de-Beauce;
  north, up to the limit of Adstock (Sainte-Method-de-Frontenac sector);
  north, up to route 269;
  north, up to the municipal limit of Saint-Éphrem-de-Beauce;
  eastward, up to a bridge on the seventh rang South road;
  towards the northeast, up to its confluence.

The Hamel river "flows on the west bank of the Bras Saint-Victor in the municipality of Saint-Éphrem-de-Beauce. This last river flows into the Chaudière River in Beauceville.

Toponymy 
The toponym Rivière des Hamel was made official on May 29, 1980, at the Commission de toponymie du Québec.

See also 

 List of rivers of Quebec

References 

Rivers of Chaudière-Appalaches
Beauce-Sartigan Regional County Municipality